"The Gentle Rain" ("Chuva Delicada") is a 1965 bossa nova composition by Luiz Bonfá, with lyrics by Matt Dubey. Originally written in A minor key and 4/4 time, this song was first released as part of the motion picture soundtrack of the 1966 film The Gentle Rain of the North-American director Burt Balaban. The music of the film was a collaboration of Luiz Bonfá as a composer and Eumir Deodato as orchestra arranger and director.

Other recorded versions
It has become a jazz standard recorded instrumental in the following albums:
 1965 Quincy Jones and His Orchestra on Quincy Plays for Pussycats. (Mercury)
 1966 Ramsey Lewis on The Movie Album. (Cadet)
 1967 Joe Pass on Simplicity. (World Pacific)
 1968 Jimmy Smith on Livin' it Up! (Verve)
 1969 George Shearing on The Fool on the Hill. (Capitol)
 1971 George Benson on Beyond the Blue Horizon. (CTI)
 1971 Oscar Peterson and The Singers Unlimited on In Tune. (MPS)
 1972 Art Farmer on Gentle Eyes. (Mainstream)
 1975 Toots Thielemans on Old Friend. (Polydor)
 1978 Joe Pass and Paulinho da Costa on Tudo Bem!. (Pablo)
 1980 Charlie Byrd on Sugarloaf Suite. (Concord Jazz Picante)
 1990 Kenny Drew Trio on Recollections. (Timeless)
 1995 Akio Sasajima and Ron Carter on Acoustically Sound. (Muse)
 2002 Joe Beck Trio on Just Friends (Whaling City Sound)
 2003 John Etheridge on Chasing Shadows. (Dyad)
 2005 李欣芸 on 國際漫遊. (國際漫遊)
 2008 Ron Thomas and Paul Klinefelter on Blues for Zarathustra. (Art of Life)
 2018 Houston Person and Ron Carter on Remember Love (HighNote)

Astrud Gilberto recorded the song in 1965 on The Shadow of Your Smile. It is also reported to be one of Tony Bennett's favorites and recorded on his 1966 album The Movie Song Album featuring Luiz Bonfá on guitar. Other recordings were by Sarah Vaughan (on the 1976 album Copacabana), Irene Kral with pianist Alan Broadbent (on the 1978 album Gentle Rain), Shirley Horn (on the 1978 album A Lazy Afternoon), Diana Krall (on the 1997 album Love Scenes), Stacey Kent featuring vocals with the saxophonist Jim Tomlinson (on the 2003 album Brazilian Sketches), Ranee Lee (on the 2003 album Maple Groove),  Barbra Streisand (on the 2009 album Love is the Answer]), and Don Burrows. It was also played at the funeral of Irish guitarist Louis Stewart in 2016 in the presence of the president of the Irish Republic but misattributed to a non-Brazilian composer in the Irish Times obituary.

References

1960s jazz standards
1965 songs
1965 compositions
Bossa nova jazz standards
Songs with music by Luiz Bonfá